Tucson, Arizona has a strong, growing independent music culture that focuses on locally grown and locally derived musical genres. The city is home to musical organizations that seek to nurture artists from the local music scene as well as introduce the community to other musical styles from beyond Southern Arizona.

Regional musical genres
Tucson is home to both home-grown and imported musical styles and influences, including:
 Desert Funk / Desert Groove / Roots Music – influenced by Sly and the Family Stone, Miles Davis, Stevie Wonder, Willie Nelson and Billie Holiday
 Desert Noir
 Desert Rock
 Mariachi – an integration of stringed instruments highly influenced by the cultural impacts of the historical development of Western Mexico
 Native American Jazz – blends Native American and non-Native musical traditions
 Sonoran Dirty Rock
 Tohono O'odham waila
 Western Cowboy

Notable musical organizations
 Arizona Opera – baroque, bel canto and verismo works, turn-of-the-century masterpieces, operettas and American operas
 Mexican Institute of Sound – electronic music project created by Mexico City-based DJ and producer Camilo Lara
 Tucson Junior Strings
 Tucson Symphony Orchestra – the oldest symphony orchestra in the American Southwest

Tucson Area Music Awards (TAMMIES)
The annual public-choice music awards – nicknamed the TAMMIES – seeks to recognize local talent by highlighting Tucson's best musical performers. The awards are held in the fall and are sponsored by Tucson Weekly magazine.

Recurring musical festivals and fairs
 Tucson Film & Music Festival celebrates the past, present and future of the Tucson, Arizona music and filmmaking scene

Notable musicians, bands, and groups
The following Tucson-based artists have been featured in a variety of local and national media.
 Alter Der Ruine – power noise / electronic music / industrial music
 Black Sun Ensemble – psychedelic rock
 Calexico – musical style is influenced by traditional Latin sounds of mariachi and Tejano music; blends "jazzy-rock with traditional Mexican music"
 Friends of Dean Martinez – instrumental rock/post-rock band, Americana tunes with influences from electronica, ambient, lounge.
 Sergio Mendoza y la Orkesta – psychedelic, indie, mambo, cumbia and jazz
 Tucson Arizona Boys Chorus
 Tucson Desert Harmony Chorus
 Tucson Girls Chorus

Notable venues
 Tucson Music Hall
 Centennial Hall
 Fox Tucson Theatre
 The Rialto Theatre
 Club Congress

References

External links
 ReverbNation Charts: Pop: Tucson, Arizona, eMinor Inc. Retrieved: September 5, 2011.
 Tucson Rock Alliance